Howard Adolph Schneider (April 24, 1930 – June 28, 2007), better known as Howie Schneider, was an award-winning cartoonist, sculptor and children's book author who lived and worked in Massachusetts. His best-known comic strip, Eek & Meek, ran from 1965 to 2000 in more than 400 newspapers through Newspaper Enterprise Association.

After ending Eek and Meek, Schneider became the editorial cartoonist in a weekly cartoon called Unshucked, for the Provincetown Banner in Provincetown, Massachusetts.

On October 6, 2003, he launched a daily and Sunday strip, The Sunshine Club, which looked at the issues of aging and was distributed by United Feature Syndicate.

Other strips of Schneider's included Percy's World and Bimbo's Circus (aka The Circus of P.T. Bimbo). His cartoons were published in numerous magazines, including The New Yorker, Playboy, Esquire, Redbook and McCall's.

Schneider served 20 years on the board of the Newspaper Features Council and eight years on the board of the National Cartoonists Society.

Awards
Schneider was a two-time winner of Best Editorial Cartoon from the New England Press Association.

Bibliography
 Wilky the White House cockroach, (Putnam, 2006) 
 Chewy Louie (Rising Moon, 2000)
 No Dogs Allowed (Putnam, 1995)
 Amos: The Story of an Old Dog and His Couch (Putnam, 1992)
 Howie Schneider Unshucked: A Cartoon Collection About the Cape the Country & Life Itself (On Cape Publications) 
 The Circus of P. T. Bimbo (Grosset & Dunlap, 1976)
 Eek and Meek (1969) (ASIN B000I16GW2)
 Mom's the Word (World, 1968) (ASIN B0020JS2N6)
 The Deceivers (Doubleday, 1961) (ASIN B0007ENUTC)

References

1930 births
2007 deaths
American editorial cartoonists
American comic strip cartoonists
People from Provincetown, Massachusetts
People from Truro, Massachusetts